The list of World War I flying aces born in Fiji contains one name thus far.

 Clive Brewster-Joske, 8 confirmed aerial victories.

References

Fiji
Colony of Fiji
Flying aces
Military history of Fiji
1910s in Fiji